= 1959–60 Plunket Shield season =

Cricket tournament in New Zealand

1959–60 Plunket Shield
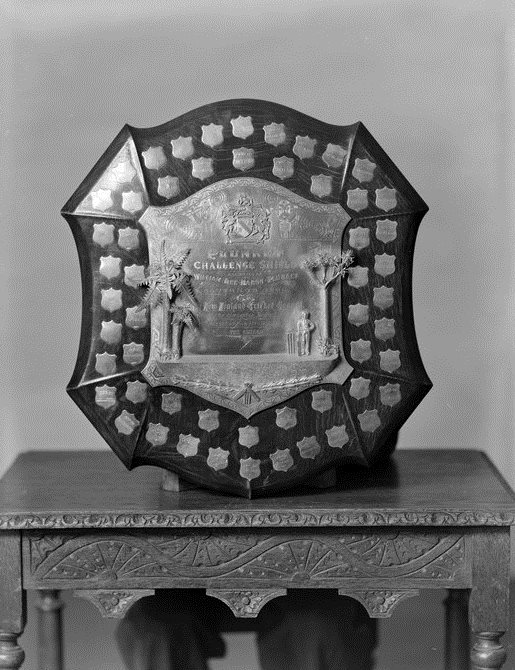
- The Plunket Shield trophy
- Cricket format: First-class
- Tournament format(s): Round-robin
- Champions: Canterbury (8th title)
- Participants: 6
- Matches: 15

The 1959–60 Plunket Shield season was a tournament of the Plunket Shield, the domestic first-class cricket competition of New Zealand.

Canterbury won the championship, finishing at the top of the points table at the end of the round-robin tournament between the six first-class sides, Auckland, Canterbury, Central Districts, Northern Districts, Otago and Wellington. Ten points were awarded for a win, five points for having a first innings lead in a draw, three points for having a first innings lead in a loss and one point for a first innings deficit in a draw.

== Table ==
Below are the Plunket Shield standings for the season:

Team	Played	Won	Lost	Drawn	Points	Net RpW
Canterbury	5	3	1	1	35	3.174
Otago	5	3	2	0	30	1.382
Wellington	5	2	1	2	25	2.913
Central Districts	5	1	2	2	23	−2.502
Auckland	5	1	2	2	19	−1.304
Northern Districts	5	0	2	3	7	−2.861
